Iyad Rimawi (born 22 January 1973), is a Syrian music composer, songwriter, and producer. He is best known for his soundtracks for several TV series such as Nadam and Godfather.

Early life and career 
 
Rimawi was born and raised in Damascus, Syria and graduated from the Faculty of Mechanical Engineering of Damascus University. He began playing guitar at the age of 12 and at the age of 14, he began composing his own music. While studying, he has formed more than one band which played folk, pop, rock and oriental genres.
 
In 1995, In association with five musicians, he formed the band “Kulna Sawa”, a Damascus-based band that signed a recording agreement in 2000 with EMI music, Kulna Sawa has toured and performed many concerts in Damascus, Aleppo, Amman, Beirut, Dubai, Kuwait, Morocco and in 20 US states during the Culture for Peace project, where the band won a Peace Prize in 2005 from the United Nations. Iyad wrote most songs’ lyrics and he was the main producer for the band albums Kulna Sawa Radio Station 2009, Musaique 2004, Shi Jdeed “New Stuff” 1999 and "Safinet Noh “Noah's arc” 1998.
In 2001, Rimawi founded his recording Studio where he composes and produces Soundtrack for numerous Syrian and Arabian TV series.
In 2012, Rimawi signed with Sony Music Middle East as the first Arab artist to sign a recording contract with Sony Music.
His first album, Tales from Damascus was released in 2012, a compilation of his selected songs, the album took second place in Virgin megastores Middle East chart.
In 2016, Rimawi released his second album, Silence in Syria which reached first place in Virgin megastores Middle East chart and remained for 3 months.
In 2018, he released his third solo album, Damascus Now, the album was produced in a time of hardship and war in Syria which has been reflected in his music.

Tours 
Iyad began touring outside of his hometown, Syrian in 2004 with his band, Kulna Sawa visiting Prince George's County, Maryland through a musical friendship tour. In 2017, Rimawi toured three major Syrian cities, Damascus, Aleppo and Latakia. In 2018, he is the first Arab musician to perform in Dubai World Trade Centre Arena, the largest indoor venue in the Middle East. The concert was titled as “Love Letters from Damascus 2018”. He then came back to Dubai with "Love Letters from Damascus 2021" which was for two days and performed at the Dubai Opera.

Discography

Kulna Sawa Band 
 1998 – Safinet Noh (Noah's Arc)
 1999 – Shi Jdeed (New Stuff)
 2004 – Musaique
 2009 – Kulna sawa Radio Station

Soundtrack 
 2003 – Saif Bin Thee Yazan – directed by Maamoun Al Bunni
 2006 – Maraya – directed by Hisham Sharbatji
 2007 – Jrn Alshaweesh – directed by Hisham Sharbatji
 2009 – Men Wanted – directed by Samer Barqawi, Hatem Ali
 2010 – After The Fall – directed by Samer Barqawi
 2011 – Al Ghofran (Forgiveness) – directed by Hatem Ali
 2012 – Hawameer al sahraa – directed by Samer Barqawi
 2013 – Death Game – directed by Al Laith Hajo and Samer Barqawi
 2013 – Revealing silence – directed by Basem Shabo
 2014 –  Lau (If Only) – directed by Samer Barqawi
 2014 – Debbo Alshanatee (Pack The Bags) – directed by Laith Hajo
 2014 – Alam homra (Rouge) – directed by Hatem Ali
 2015 – Godfather (Orient Club) – directed by Hatem Ali
 2015 – Cello – directed by Samer Barqawi
 2015 – 24 Carat – directed by Al Laith Hajo
 2016 – Samra – directed by Rasha Sharbatji
 2016 – Ya Ret – directed by Philip Asmar
 2016 – Nadam (Regret) – directed by Al Laith Hajo
 2017 – Orkidia – directed by Hatem Ali
 2017 – Shaowk (Missing)  – directed by Rasha Sharbatji
 2018 – Shababik (Windows) – directed by Samer Barqawi
 2018 – Farmers Revolution – directed by Philip Asmar
 2019 – Ma Fiyi –directed by Rasha Sharbatji
 2019 – Masafet Aman – directed by Al Laith Hajo
 2019 – Haramlek – directed by Tamer Ishak
 2020 – Awlad Adam – directed by Al Laith Hajo
 2020 – Souq Al Harir – directed by Moumen Almalla

Albums 
 2011 – Forgiveness Soundtrack
 2012 – Tales from Damascus
 2015 – Godfather Soundtrack
 2016 – Silence in Syria
 2018 – Damascus Now
 2021 – Sailing Nowhere EP
 2022 – Rouge Soundtrack

Live Concerts 
 2015 – Damascus Opera House Concert, Damascus, Syria.
 2017 – Syria Tour, Damascus, Aleppo and Latakia, Syria.
 2018 – Love Letters from Damascus. Dubai, UAE.
2021 – Love Letters from Damascus. Dubai Opera, UAE 
2021 – Nights at Dubai Expo 2020. Dubai, UAE.
2022 – The Syrian Rhapsody. Expo 2020 Dubai
2022 – One Night at Dubai Opera. Dubai, UAE.

References

External links 
 Official website
 

1973 births
Living people
Syrian composers
People from Damascus
Damascus University alumni